Rex Frederick Jackson (7 October 192831 December 2011) was an Australian politician, elected as a member of the New South Wales Legislative Assembly and subsequently imprisoned for conspiracy.

Biography
Jackson was born in Wagga Wagga, New South Wales, the son of a railway fettler. He was educated at Harefield Public School and Junee, and Sutherland High Schools. He became a rail employee, professional boxer and printer. He married his wife, Irene, in 1949.

Jackson was the member for Bulli from 1955 to 1971, and the member for Heathcote from 1971 to 1986, representing the Labor Party. He was Minister for Youth and Community Services from May 1976 to October 1981 and then Minister for Corrective Services from October 1981 to October 1983. He was also Minister for Roads from February to October 1983.

Jackson resigned his ministerial portfolios on 27 October 1983 and from parliament on 13 August 1986. He was charged with corruption and sent to trial in 1987. The District Court found that Jackson accepted a bribe of 12,000 in 1983 and that he conspired to organise the early release of three prisoners from Broken Hill Correctional Centre to meet gambling debts. He was initially sentenced to serve seven and a half years in custody (with three years without parole). However, in 1988 The Crown appealed to the Court of Criminal Appeal against the leniency of the sentence. Jackson was subsequently sent to prison for ten years, with a non-parole period of five years, serving time at Berrima Correctional Centre.

Following his early release from prison in November 1990, after serving three years and two months of his 10-year term, he returned to his Helensburgh home and was welcomed back by many in his community.

For some years, Jackson operated an ice cream van with business partner Col Alexander, called "Col and Rex's Hot Dogs and Ice Cream" which regularly parked at the top of Bald Hill, a popular hang-gliding spot in Stanwell Tops, south of Sydney. Jackson's wife Irene suffered from arthritis and diabetes, and had a stroke just six weeks after his homecoming. She was hospitalised and then placed in a nursing home, dying in early 1993.

Jackson died on 31 December 2011, aged 83.

Minister for Youth and Community Services
From May 1976 to October 1981, Jackson held the post of Minister of Youth and Community Services (DoYCS). Under his tenure, the Department began funding youth refuges located in NSW, including Caretakers Cottage, Young People's Refuge and Taldamunde Youth Services.

Further reading

References

 

1928 births
2011 deaths
Members of the New South Wales Legislative Assembly
People from Wagga Wagga
Australian politicians convicted of crimes
Australian Labor Party members of the Parliament of New South Wales